These are the results for the Mixed 10 metre air rifle event at the 2018 Summer Youth Olympics.

Results

Qualification

Draw

References

External links
 Qualification results
 Round of 16 results
 Quarterfinals results
 Semifinals results
 Medal matches results

Shooting at the 2018 Summer Youth Olympics